Mbugani is an administrative ward in the Chunya district of the Mbeya Region of Tanzania. In 2016 the Tanzania National Bureau of Statistics report there were 9,626 people in the ward, from 8,734 in 2012.

Vitongoji 
The ward has 3 vitongoji.
 Butiama
 Mbugani
 Roma

References 

Wards of Mbeya Region